Frontier war may refer to:

 Xhosa Wars (1779–1879), also known as the Cape Frontier Wars
 Australian frontier wars (1788–1934)
 Western theater of the American Revolutionary War
 American Indian Wars or American Frontier Wars, from the 17th century to the early 20th century